Frederick Baugh (1925-2007) was an Australian weightlifter. He competed in the men's middleweight event at the 1956 Summer Olympics.

References

External links
 

1925 births
2007 deaths
date of birth missing
date of death missing
Australian male weightlifters
Olympic weightlifters of Australia
Weightlifters at the 1956 Summer Olympics
Place of birth missing
20th-century Australian people
21st-century Australian people